Falman is a census-designated place (CDP) in San Patricio County, Texas, United States. The population was 76 at the 2010 census. Prior to the 2010 census Falman was part of the Falman-County Acres CDP.

Geography
Falman is located at  (27.928053, -97.171276).

Education
It is in the Aransas Pass Independent School District.

References

Census-designated places in San Patricio County, Texas
Census-designated places in Texas
Corpus Christi metropolitan area